The Whangamaroro River is a short river of the Coromandel Peninsula, in the Waikato Region of New Zealand's North Island. It flows east to reach a northwestern arm of Whitianga Harbour

See also
List of rivers of New Zealand

References

Thames-Coromandel District
Rivers of Waikato
Rivers of New Zealand